Bimbo Oloyede is a veteran Nigerian TV journalist and producer. As a newscaster, she was a mainstay on NTA Network News from 1976 to 1980.

Oloyede's father was M.E.K. Roberts, a former deputy inspector general of police, she spent much of her adolescent life in England where she studied drama and theatre arts. When she returned to Nigeria, she began as a production staff of the drama department at Lagos Television Station owned by the Nigerian Broadcasting Corporation (NBC). When NBC was reorganized into the Nigerian Television Authority, Oloyede was nominated as a newscaster for the Nigerian Television Authority's 9 pm Network News, her first broadcast was in April 1976. In 1980, she left NTA and co-founded a media company with her husband.

Oloyede narrates how she became first female TV network newscaster in Nigeria 

Oloyede is in the initiator of the Women Optimum Development Foundation, WODEF, an NGO that raises awareness about issues concerning young girls and women.

Oloyede, according to records, has put in over forty years’ work life in Nigeria's broadcast media. Her speaking engagements, on the platform of trending "Strictly Speaking Limited"; as the Founder & Trainer, has helped not a few women journalists gained some remarkable confidence in public speaking. And as a life coach, Oloyede had hosted several public speaking and training sessions for women in Nigeria.

Her WODEF has actually been rewarding the role of deserving women committed to making their communities better for over a decade.

Oloyede is actually a multi-talented woman who has played several roles in the Nigerian society including being an on-the-spur-of-the-moment compere person among others.

References

Nigerian women journalists
Yoruba women journalists
Nigerian television personalities
Living people
Nigerian broadcasters
Nigerian expatriates in the United Kingdom
Year of birth missing (living people)